Renaldo Snipes (born Reenaold Snipes on August 15, 1956) is a retired American professional  boxer, best known for his title championship bout with Larry Holmes.

Amateur career
Snipes was a two-time Chicago Golden Gloves Champion (1977 and 1978). He lost on a first-round stoppage to future heavyweight contender Eddie Gregg in the 1978 Intercity match-ups between Chicago and New York Golden Glove winners.

Professional career 
Nicknamed "Mister" Snipes, Snipes started off his career successfully, with a first-round knockout of Carl Halliburton.  That fight was on the same card that future heavyweight contender James Tillis made his debut on. 21 more wins followed, and he challenged world heavyweight champion Larry Holmes for the title November 6, 1981 in Pittsburgh. Snipes knocked down the champion in the seventh round.  However Holmes got up and Snipes was stopped in Round 11. Snipes complained that Holmes was the beneficiary of a long count. Films show, however, that the claim is exaggerated; Holmes rose at the count of 4 and though badly hurt, fought off the charging Snipes for the remainder of the round. Snipes fought a string of world-class fighters after the Holmes bout, in contests that mostly descended into wildly entertaining brawls. He amassed a record of 39 wins (22 by knockout), 8 losses, and 1 draw. In his career he fought boxers Larry Holmes, Trevor Berbick, Gerrie Coetzee, Tim Witherspoon, Greg Page, Eddie Mustafa Muhammad, Alfredo Evangelista, Rickey Parkey, South African puncher Johnny DuPlooy and many more.

Tyson fight
Snipes had been in the frame for a big money fight with Mike Tyson in 1990, however he broke his right hand in a fight with rugged journeyman Jamie Howe and lost out on the opportunity, which later went to Alex Stewart. The injury and rehabilitation took him out for two years, and when he returned in June 1992 (aged 36) he fought then-dangerous Garing Lane, surviving an 8th-round count to score a split decision win. He knocked out Eddie Curry the following year before being matched with heavily hyped undefeated Cuban giant Jorge Luis Gonzalez on the high-profile Bowe/Holyfield II undercard. At 37, Snipes struggled with the bigger younger man, and after a gallant effort was stopped with less than a minute remaining in the 10th and final round, after a knockdown, with the stoppage being announced to be because of cuts, much to his disgust.

In 1993 former mobster Sammy Gravano testified under oath that in the late 80s he attempted to arrange a fixed fight between Snipes and undefeated WBO champion Francesco Damiani, who Gravano alleged was associated with an organized crime family in Italy. The winner (Snipes) would fight Tyson, however Damiani lost his fight with Ray Mercer before the Snipes bout and that put him out of the picture for a major fight.

Professional boxing record

|-
|align="center" colspan=8|39 Wins (22 knockouts, 17 decisions), 8 Losses (2 knockouts, 6 decisions), 1 Draw 
|-
| align="center" style="border-style: none none solid solid; background: #e3e3e3"|Result
| align="center" style="border-style: none none solid solid; background: #e3e3e3"|Record
| align="center" style="border-style: none none solid solid; background: #e3e3e3"|Opponent
| align="center" style="border-style: none none solid solid; background: #e3e3e3"|Type
| align="center" style="border-style: none none solid solid; background: #e3e3e3"|Round
| align="center" style="border-style: none none solid solid; background: #e3e3e3"|Date
| align="center" style="border-style: none none solid solid; background: #e3e3e3"|Location
| align="center" style="border-style: none none solid solid; background: #e3e3e3"|Notes
|-align=center
|Loss
|
|align=left| Jorge Luis Gonzalez
|TKO
|10
|06/11/1993
|align=left| Caesars Palace, Las Vegas, Nevada, U.S.
|align=left|
|-
|Win
|
|align=left| Eddie Curry
|KO
|3
|24/06/1993
|align=left| Paramount Theater, New York City, U.S.
|align=left|
|-
|Win
|
|align=left| Garing Lane
|SD
|10
|26/06/1992
|align=left| King Street Palace, Charleston, South Carolina, U.S.
|align=left|
|-
|Win
|
|align=left| Jamie Howe
|PTS
|10
|18/05/1990
|align=left| Callicoon, New York, U.S.
|align=left|
|-
|Win
|
|align=left| Tim Adams
|TKO
|3
|26/12/1989
|align=left| Memphis, Tennessee, U.S.
|align=left|
|-
|Win
|
|align=left| Melvin Epps
|PTS
|10
|14/09/1989
|align=left| Beacon Theatre and Hotel, New York City, U.S.
|align=left|
|-
|Win
|
|align=left| Manoel De Almeida
|TKO
|10
|11/05/1989
|align=left| Felt Forum, New York City, U.S.
|align=left|
|-
|Win
|
|align=left| Andre Crowder
|TKO
|3
|30/03/1989
|align=left| Felt Forum, New York City, U.S.
|align=left|
|-
|Win
|
|align=left| Lionel Washington
|TKO
|4
|15/12/1988
|align=left| Felt Forum, New York City, U.S.
|align=left|
|-
|Win
|
|align=left| Johnny DuPlooy
|TKO
|7
|12/08/1988
|align=left| Eagles Club, Milwaukee, Wisconsin, U.S.
|align=left|
|-
|Win
|
|align=left| Terry Armstrong
|TKO
|8
|16/06/1988
|align=left| Felt Forum, New York City, U.S.
|align=left|
|-
|Loss
|
|align=left| Orlin Norris
|UD
|12
|19/03/1988
|align=left| Caesars Palace, Las Vegas, Nevada, U.S.
|align=left|
|-
|Win
|
|align=left| Terry Anderson
|KO
|10
|23/07/1987
|align=left| Felt Forum, New York City, U.S.
|align=left|
|-
|Win
|
|align=left| Richard Earl Scott
|UD
|10
|04/06/1987
|align=left| Felt Forum, New York City, U.S.
|align=left|
|-
|Win
|
|align=left| Melvin Epps
|TKO
|5
|09/04/1987
|align=left| Felt Forum, New York City, U.S.
|align=left|
|-
|Loss
|
|align=left| Tyrell Biggs
|UD
|10
|12/12/1986
|align=left| Madison Square Garden, New York City, U.S.
|align=left|
|-
|Win
|
|align=left| Donnie Long
|UD
|10
|17/08/1986
|align=left| Trump Plaza Hotel and Casino, Atlantic City, New Jersey, U.S.
|align=left|
|-
|Win
|
|align=left| Dennis Fikes
|KO
|2
|24/07/1986
|align=left| Felt Forum, New York City, U.S.
|align=left|
|-
|Win
|
|align=left| Bobby Crabtree
|KO
|5
|10/07/1986
|align=left| Felt Forum, New York City, U.S.
|align=left|
|-
|Loss
|
|align=left| Ricky Parkey
|SD
|10
|30/10/1984
|align=left| Tropicana Hotel & Casino, Atlantic City, New Jersey, U.S.
|align=left|
|-
|Loss
|
|align=left| Alfredo Evangelista
|SD
|10
|23/09/1983
|align=left| Richfield Coliseum, Richfield, Ohio, U.S.
|align=left|
|-
|Loss
|
|align=left| Greg Page
|UD
|12
|20/05/1983
|align=left| Dunes Hotel, Las Vegas, Nevada, U.S.
|align=left|
|-
|Win
|
|align=left| Trevor Berbick
|PTS
|10
|02/10/1982
|align=left| Sands Atlantic City, Atlantic City, New Jersey, U.S.
|align=left|
|-
|Loss
|
|align=left| Tim Witherspoon
|MD
|10
|05/06/1982
|align=left| Caesars Palace, Las Vegas, Nevada, U.S.
|align=left|
|-
|Draw
|
|align=left| Scott Frank
|PTS
|10
|21/03/1982
|align=left| Playboy Hotel and Casino, Atlantic City, New Jersey, U.S.
|align=left|
|-
|Loss
|
|align=left| Larry Holmes
|TKO
|11
|06/11/1981
|align=left| Pittsburgh Civic Arena, Pittsburgh, Pennsylvania, U.S.
|align=left|
|-
|Win
|
|align=left| Gerrie Coetzee
|SD
|10
|09/08/1981
|align=left| New Westchester Theater, Tarrytown, New York, U.S.
|align=left|
|-
|Win
|
|align=left| Eddie Mustafa Muhammad
|SD
|10
|17/05/1981
|align=left| Bally's Atlantic City, Atlantic City, New Jersey, U.S.
|align=left|
|-
|Win
|
|align=left| Floyd Cummings
|UD
|10
|08/03/1981
|align=left| Resorts Atlantic City, Atlantic City, New Jersey, U.S.
|align=left|
|-
|Win
|
|align=left| Leroy Boone
|PTS
|10
|21/01/1981
|align=left| Westchester County Center, White Plains, New York, U.S.
|align=left|
|-
|Win
|
|align=left| Dwain Bonds
|KO
|8
|17/12/1980
|align=left| Westchester County Center, White Plains, New York, U.S.
|align=left|
|-
|Win
|
|align=left| Malik Dozier
|KO
|5
|25/11/1980
|align=left| Boston, Massachusetts, U.S.
|align=left|
|-
|Win
|
|align=left| Rodell Dupree
|KO
|3
|18/10/1980
|align=left| Atlantic City Convention Center, Atlantic City, New Jersey, U.S.
|align=left|
|-
|Win
|
|align=left| Larry Alexander
|KO
|2
|17/09/1980
|align=left| Westchester County Center, White Plains, New York, U.S.
|align=left|
|-
|Win
|
|align=left| Robert Colay
|KO
|1
|09/08/1980
|align=left| Superstar Theatre, Atlantic City, New Jersey, U.S.
|align=left|
|-
|Win
|
|align=left| Johnny Warr
|PTS
|8
|11/06/1980
|align=left| Westchester County Center, White Plains, New York, U.S.
|align=left|
|-
|Win
|
|align=left| James Reid
|KO
|3
|14/05/1980
|align=left| Westchester County Center, White Plains, New York, U.S.
|align=left|
|-
|Win
|
|align=left| Dave Johnson
|PTS
|8
|16/04/1980
|align=left| Westchester County Center, White Plains, New York, U.S.
|align=left|
|-
|Win
|
|align=left| Tyrone Harlee
|KO
|4
|05/12/1979
|align=left| Westchester County Center, White Plains, New York, U.S.
|align=left|
|-
|Win
|
|align=left| Mike Tarasewich
|PTS
|8
|10/10/1979
|align=left| Westchester County Center, White Plains, New York, U.S.
|align=left|
|-
|Win
|
|align=left| Eugene Green
|PTS
|6
|08/07/1979
|align=left| Felt Forum, New York City, U.S.
|align=left|
|-
|Win
|
|align=left| "Young" Charles Cox
|PTS
|6
|20/06/1979
|align=left| Westchester County Center, White Plains, New York, U.S.
|align=left|
|-
|Win
|
|align=left| Barry "Fighting Postman" Funches
|KO
|3
|23/05/1979
|align=left| Westchester County Center, White Plains, New York, U.S.
|align=left|
|-
|Win
|
|align=left| Dave Smith
|KO
|3
|11/04/1979
|align=left| Westchester County Center, White Plains, New York, U.S.
|align=left|
|-
|Win
|
|align=left|"Inspector" Ron Hope
|PTS
|4
|14/03/1979
|align=left| Westchester County Center, White Plains, New York, U.S.
|align=left|
|-
|Win
|
|align=left| Sam Miller
|KO
|3
|14/02/1979
|align=left| Westchester County Center, White Plains, New York, U.S.
|align=left|
|-
|Win
|
|align=left|Hal Emerson
|PTS
|4
|15/12/1978
|align=left| Westchester County Center, White Plains, New York, U.S.
|align=left|
|-
|Win
|
|align=left| Carl Halliburton
|KO
|1
|18/11/1978
|align=left| DePaul University Alumni Hall, Chicago, Illinois, U.S.
|align=left|
|}

Life after boxing
April 30th 2017 Inducted into the New York Boxing Hall of fame. 

Snipes currently resides in New York City.  He currently is involved in numerous charity fund-raising projects and was awarded the "Ring 8 2012 Community Service Award". He was inducted into the New Jersey Boxing Hall of Fame on Nov 1, 2006 and the New York State Boxing Hall of Fame on April 30, 2017.

Snipes is an avid cigar smoker and is a much sought after guest at many New York cigar lounges.

References 
 

1956 births
Living people
People from Houston
Boxers from Texas
Heavyweight boxers
Sportspeople from New York (state)
American male boxers
Boxers from New York (state)